Neptis nicobule, the scarce clubbed sailer, is a butterfly in the family Nymphalidae. It is found in Sierra Leone, Liberia, Ivory Coast, Ghana, Nigeria, Cameroon, Gabon, the Republic of the Congo, the Central African Republic, the Democratic Republic of the Congo (Uele and Lualaba), Uganda, western Kenya and north-western Tanzania. The habitat consists of wet forests.

The larvae feed on Cnestis ferruginea, Tetrapleura and Swartzia species.

References

Butterflies described in 1892
nicobule
Butterflies of Africa